Ban Kruat is a district (amphoe) of Buriram province, northeastern Thailand.

History
The district was created in 1938 by splitting the single tambon Ban Kruat from Prakhon Chai district. It was, at first, a minor district (king amphoe). In 1965 it was upgraded to a full district.

Geography
The district is bounded in the south by the Dangrek Range. Neighboring districts are (from the west clockwise) Lahan Sai and Prakhon Chai of Buriram Province, and Prasat and Phanom Dong Rak of Surin province. To the south it borders the province Oddar Meancheay of Cambodia.

Motto
The Ban Kruat District's motto is "The city of metallurgy, ancient porcelain and quarry, beautiful Obok Viewpoint, Makha Dam and border in Phanomdong Rak mountain range."

Administration
The district is divided into nine sub-districts (tambons), which are further subdivided into 122 villages (mubans). There are two sub-district municipalities (thesaban tambons): Ban Kruat covers parts of tambon Ban Kruat and Prasat, and Talad Nikhom Prasat covers further parts of tambon Prasat. There are also nine tambon administrative organizations (TAO) responsible for the non-municipal areas.

References

External links
amphoe.com (Thai)

Ban Kruat